In fluid dynamics, the volumetric flux is the rate of volume flow across a unit area (m3·s−1·m−2), and has dimensions of distance/time (volume/(time*area)) - equivalent to mean velocity. The density of a particular property in a fluid's volume, multiplied with the volumetric flux of the fluid, thus defines the advective flux of that property. The volumetric flux through a porous medium is often modelled using Darcy's law.

Volumetric flux is not to be confused with volumetric flow rate, which is the volume of fluid that passes through a given surface per unit of time (as opposed to a unit surface).

References

Physical quantities
Vector calculus
Fluid dynamics